was the 119th Emperor of Japan, according to the traditional order of succession. Kōkaku reigned from 16 December 1780 until his abdication on 7 May 1817 in favor of his son, Emperor Ninkō. After his abdication, he ruled as  also known as a  until his death in 1840. The next emperor to abdicate of his own accord was Akihito, 202 years later.

Major events in Kōkaku's life included an ongoing famine that affected Japan early into his rule. The response he gave during the time was welcomed by the people, and helped to undermine the shōgun's authority. The Kansei Reforms came afterwards as a way for the shōgun to cure a range of perceived problems which had developed in the mid-18th century but was met with partial success.

A member of a cadet branch of the Imperial Family, Kōkaku is the founder of the dynastic imperial branch which currently sits on the throne. Kōkaku had one spouse during his lifetime, and six concubines who gave birth to 16 children. Only one son, Prince Ayahito, survived into adulthood and eventually became the next Emperor. Genealogically, Kōkaku is the lineal ancestor of all the succeeding Emperors up to the current Emperor, Naruhito.

Events of Kōkaku's life

Early life
He was the sixth son of Imperial Prince Kan'in Sukehito (閑院宮典仁, 1733–1794) the second Prince Kan'in of the Kan'in-no-miya imperial collateral branch. As a younger son of a cadet branch, the Kan'in house, it was originally expected that Morohito would go into the priesthood at the Shugoin Temple. The situation changed in 1779 in the form of a problem as Emperor Go-Momozono was dying without an heir to the throne. In order to avoid a dynastic interregnum, the now-retired Empress Go-Sakuramachi and the Emperor's chief adviser encouraged Go-Momozono to hastily adopt Prince Morohito. The adopted prince was the Emperor's second cousin once removed in the biological male line. Go-Momozono died on 16 December 1779, and a year later Morohito acceded to the throne at age eight.

As Emperor

During his reign, Kōkaku attempted to re-assert some of the Imperial authority over the Shōgun (or bakufu). He undertook this by first implementing a relief program during the Great Tenmei famine, which not only highlighted the ineffectiveness of the bakufu in looking after its subjects, but also focused the subjects' attention back to the Imperial household. He also took an active interest in foreign affairs; keeping himself informed about the border dispute with Russia to the north, as well as keeping himself abreast of knowledge regarding foreign currency, both Chinese and European.  The new era name of Tenmei ("Dawn") was created to mark the enthronement of new Emperor.  The previous era ended and the new one commenced in An'ei 11, on the 2nd day of the 4th month. In his first year of reign, Kōkaku was instrumental in reviving old ceremonies involving the old Imperial Court, as well as those performed at the Iwashimizu and Kamono shrines.

An analysis of silver currency in China and Japan "Sin sen sen pou (Sin tchuan phou)" was presented to the Emperor in 1782 by Kutsuki Masatsuna (1750–1802), also known as Kutsuki Oki-no kami Minamoto-no Masatsuna, hereditary daimyōs of Oki and Ōmi with holdings in Tanba and Fukuchiyama. Masatsuna published Seiyō senpu (Notes on Western Coinage) five years later, with plates showing European and colonial currency. Countrywide currency reforms later came after the Meiji Restoration when a new system was adopted around the Japanese yen. In 1786, former Empress Go-Sakuramachi engaged Go-Momozono's only child (Princess Yoshiko) to the new Emperor. Yoshiko formally became Empress consort to Emperor Kōkaku at age 15.

The Emperor and his court were forced to flee from a fire that consumed the city of Kyoto in 1788, the Imperial Palace was destroyed as a result. No other re-construction was permitted until a new palace was completed. The Dutch VOC Opperhoofd in Dejima noted in his official record book that "people are considering it to be a great and extraordinary heavenly portent." The new era name of Kansei (meaning "Tolerant Government" or "Broad-minded Government") was created in 1789 to mark a number of calamities including the devastating fire at the Imperial Palace. The previous era ended and a new one commenced in Tenmei 9, on the 25th day of the 1st month. During the same year, the Emperor came into dispute with the Tokugawa shogunate about his intention to give the title of Abdicated Emperor (Daijō Tennō, 太上天皇) to his father, Prince Sukehito. This dispute was later called the "Songo incident" (the "respectful title incident"), and was resolved when the Bakufu gave his father the honorary title of "Retired Emperor".

Two more eras would follow during Kōkaku's reign, on 5 February 1801 a new era name (Kyōwa) was created because of the belief that the 58th year of every cycle of the Chinese zodiac brings great changes. Three years later the new era name of Bunka (meaning "Culture" or "Civilization") was created to mark the start of a new 60-year cycle of the Heavenly Stem and Earthly Branch system of the Chinese calendar which was on New Year's Day. During this year, Daigaku-no-kami Hayashi Jussai (1768–1841) explained the shogunate foreign policy to Emperor Kōkaku in Kyoto. The rest of Kōkaku's reign was quiet aside from two 6.6m earthquakes which struck Honshū in the years 1810 and 1812. The effects on the population from these earthquakes (if any) is unknown.

Kansei Reforms
The  were a series of reactionary policy changes and edicts which were intended to cure a range of perceived problems which had developed in mid-18th-century Tokugawa Japan. Kansei refers to the nengō (or Japanese era name) that spanned the years from 1789 through 1801 (after "Tenmei" and before "Kyōwa"); with the reforms occurring during the Kansei period but between the years 1787–1793. In the end, the shogunate's interventions were only partly successful. Intervening factors like famine, floods and other disasters exacerbated some of the conditions which the shōgun intended to ameliorate.

Matsudaira Sadanobu (1759–1829) was named the shōguns chief councilor (rōjū) in the summer of 1787; and early in the next year, he became the regent for the 11th shōgun, Tokugawa Ienari. As the chief administrative decision-maker in the bakufu hierarchy, he was in a position to effect radical change; and his initial actions represented an aggressive break with the recent past. Sadanobu's efforts were focused on strengthening the government by reversing many of the policies and practices which had become commonplace under the regime of the previous shōgun, Tokugawa Ieharu. Sadanobu increased the bakufu's rice reserves and required daimyos to do the same. He reduced expenditures in cities, set aside reserves for future famines, and encouraged peasants in cities to go back to the countryside. He tried to institute policies that promoted morality and frugality, such as prohibiting extravagant activities in the countryside and curbing unlicensed prostitution in the cities. Sadanobu also cancelled some debts owed by daimyos to the merchants.

These reform policies could be interpreted as a reactionary response to the excesses of his rōjū predecessor, Tanuma Okitsugu (1719–1788).  The result was that the Tanuma-initiated, liberalizing reforms within the bakufu and the relaxation of sakoku (Japan's "closed-door" policy of strict control of foreign merchants) were reversed or blocked. Education policy was changed through the Kansei Edict (寛政異学の禁 kansei igaku no kin) of 1790 which enforced teaching of the Neo-Confucianism of Zhu Xi as the official Confucian philosophy of Japan. The decree banned certain publications and enjoined strict observance of Neo-Confucian doctrine, especially with regard to the curriculum of the official Hayashi school.

This reform movement was related to three others during the Edo period: the Kyōhō reforms (1722–1730), the Tenpō reforms (1841–1843) and the Keiō reforms (1864–1867).

Abdication and death

In 1817, Kōkaku abdicated in favor of his son, Emperor Ninkō. In the two centuries before Kōkaku's reign most Emperors died young or were forced to abdicate. Kōkaku was the first Japanese monarch to remain on the throne past the age of 40 since the abdication of Emperor Ōgimachi in 1586. Until the abdication of Emperor Akihito in 2019, he was the last Emperor to rule as a Jōkō (上皇), an Emperor who abdicated in favor of a successor. Kōkaku travelled in procession to Sento Imperial Palace, a palace of an abdicated Emperor. The Sento Palace at that time was called Sakura Machi Palace. It had been built by the Tokugawa shogunate for former-Emperor Go-Mizunoo.

After Kōkaku's death in 1840, he was enshrined in the Imperial mausoleum, which is at Sennyū-ji in Higashiyama-ku, Kyoto.  Also enshrined in Tsuki no wa no misasagi, at Sennyū-ji are this Emperor's immediate Imperial predecessors since Emperor Go-Mizunoo – Meishō, Go-Kōmyō, Go-Sai, Reigen, Higashiyama, Nakamikado, Sakuramachi, Momozono, Go-Sakuramachi and Go-Momozono. This mausoleum complex also includes misasagi for Kōkaku's immediate successors – Ninkō and Kōmei. Empress Dowager Yoshikō is also entombed at this Imperial mausoleum complex.

Eras and Kugyō
The following years of Kōkaku's reign are more specifically identified by more than one era name or nengō. 
 An'ei (1772–1781)
 Tenmei (1781–1789)
 Kansei (1789–1801)
 Kyōwa  (1801–1804)
 Bunka (1804–1818)

 is a collective term for the very few most powerful men attached to the court of the Emperor of Japan in pre-Meiji eras. Even during those years in which the court's actual influence outside the palace walls was minimal, the hierarchic organization persisted. In general, this elite group included only three to four men at a time.  These were hereditary courtiers whose experience and background would have brought them to the pinnacle of a life's career.  During Kōkaku's reign, this apex of the Daijō-kan included:

 Sesshō, Kujō Naozane, 1779–1785
 Kampaku, Kujō Naozane, 1785–1787
 Kampaku, Takatsukasa Sukehira, 1787–1791
 Kampaku, Ichijō Teruyoshi, 1791–1795
 Kampaku, Takatsukasa Masahiro, 1795–1814
 Kampaku, Ichijō Tadayoshi, 1814–1823

Genealogy

Spouse

Yoshiko was the only child of former Emperor Go-Momozono. She formally became Empress consort (chūgū) to Emperor Kōkaku at age 15 after she was engaged to the new Emperor by former empress Go-Sakuramachi. The couple had two sons but both died before reaching adulthood. Yoshiko eventually functioned as an official mother to the heir who would become Emperor Ninkō. In 1816, Emperor Ninkō granted Empress Yoshiko the title of Empress Dowager after Emperor Kōkaku abdicated.

Concubines

Issue 
Emperor Kōkaku fathered a total of 16 children (8 sons and 8 daughters) but only one of them survived into adulthood. The sole surviving child (Prince Ayahito) later became Emperor Ninkō when Kōkaku abdicated the throne.

Ancestry

See also
 Emperor of Japan
 List of Emperors of Japan
 Imperial cult
 Imperial House of Japan
 Modern system of ranked Shinto shrines

Notes

References
 Meyer, Eva-Maria. (1999).  Japans Kaiserhof in der Edo-Zeit: unter besonderer Berücksichtigung der Jahre 1846 bis 1867.  Münster: LIT Verlag. 	;   OCLC 42041594
 Ponsonby-Fane, Richard Arthur Brabazon. (1959). The Imperial House of Japan. Kyoto: Ponsonby Memorial Society. OCLC 194887
 Screech, Timon. (2006). Secret Memoirs of the Shoguns: Isaac Titsingh and Japan, 1779–1822. London: RoutledgeCurzon. ; OCLC 65177072
 Screech, Timon. (2000).   Shogun's Painted Culture: Fear and Creativity in the Japanese States, 1760–1829. London:  Reaktion. IBN 9781861890641;   OCLC 42699671
 Titsingh, Isaac. (1834). Nihon Ōdai Ichiran; ou,  Annales des empereurs du Japon.  Paris: Royal Asiatic Society, Oriental Translation Fund of Great Britain and Ireland.  OCLC 5850691
 Varley, H. Paul. (1980). Jinnō Shōtōki: A Chronicle of Gods and Sovereigns. New York: Columbia University Press. ;  OCLC 59145842

External links 
 National Archives of Japan: Sakuramachiden Gyokozu, scroll depicting Emperor Kōkaku in formal procession, 1817 (Bunka 14).

Japanese emperors
1771 births
1840 deaths
Japanese retired emperors
People of Edo-period Japan
1780s in Japan
1790s in Japan
1800s in Japan
1810s in Japan
18th-century Japanese monarchs
19th-century Japanese monarchs